Kim Seok-jin (born December 4, 1992), also known professionally as Jin, is a South Korean singer, songwriter, and member of the South Korean boy band BTS. Kim has co-written and released three solo tracks with BTS: "Awake" in 2016, "Epiphany" in 2018, and "Moon" in 2020, all of which have charted on South Korea's Gaon Digital Chart. In 2019, Kim released his first independent song, the digital track "Tonight". He made his official debut as a solo artist in October 2022, with the release of the single "The Astronaut".

Apart from singing, Kim appeared as a host on multiple South Korean music programs from 2016 to 2018. In 2018, he was awarded the fifth-class Hwagwan Order of Cultural Merit by the President of South Korea along with his bandmates for his contributions to Korean culture.

Early life and education 
Kim Seok-jin was born on December 4, 1992, in Anyang, Gyeonggi Province, South Korea.  His family consists of his mother, father, and older brother. In 2007, he went to a study camp in Australia to learn English. 

Kim originally wanted to be a journalist but decided to pursue acting after watching Kim Nam-gil in Queen Seondeok. While in junior high school, he was scouted by South Korean K-pop agency SM Entertainment off the street but rejected the offer at the time. Initially intending to be an actor, Kim attended Konkuk University and graduated with a degree in Film Studies on February 22, 2017. He later enrolled in graduate school at Hanyang Cyber University to pursue studies in areas other than music.

Career

2013–present: BTS 

Kim was scouted by Big Hit Entertainment for his looks while walking down the street. At the time Kim was studying acting and had no background in music. Subsequently, he auditioned for Big Hit as an actor before becoming an idol trainee. On June 13, 2013, Kim made his debut as one of the four vocalists in BTS with their debut single album 2 Cool 4 Skool. Kim released his first co-produced track, a solo single from the album Wings titled "Awake", in 2016. The song peaked at number 31 on the Gaon Digital Chart and number six on the Billboard World Digital Song Sales chart in the United States. In December 2016, he released a Christmas version of "Awake" on SoundCloud.

On August 9, 2018, the second solo by Kim, "Epiphany", was released as a trailer for BTS' then-upcoming compilation album Love Yourself: Answer. The song was described as a "building pop-rock melody" by Billboard and contains lyrics discussing self-acceptance and self-love. The full version of the song was eventually released as a track on Answer, peaking at number 30 on the Gaon Digital Chart and number four on the US World Digital Song Sales chart. In October, he was awarded the fifth-class Hwagwan Order of Cultural Merit by South Korean president Moon Jae-in along with other members of the group.

He released his third solo song with BTS, "Moon", on the 2020 studio album Map of the Soul: 7. Variety writer Jae-Ha Kim described "Moon" as a power pop song addressed to BTS fans. "Moon" peaked at number one on the Gaon Digital Chart and number two on the World Digital Song Sales chart.

In July 2021, Kim was appointed Special Presidential Envoy for Future Generations and Culture by President Moon Jae-in, alongside his bandmates, to help "lead the global agenda for future generations, such as sustainable growth" and "expand South Korea's diplomatic efforts and global standing" in the international community.

2015–present: Solo activities 
In 2016, Kim collaborated with bandmate V on the single "It's Definitely You", released as part of the Hwarang: The Poet Warrior Youth original soundtrack, and later received a co-nomination for Best  at the 2017 Melon Music Awards. In June 2018, Kim featured on an alternate version of "So Far Away", a song from bandmate Suga's debut mixtape Agust D (2016), alongside bandmate Jungkook, which was released during the band's fifth anniversary celebrations. Kim's solo covers include "Mom" by Ra.D, "I Love You" by Mate, and "In Front Of The Post Office In Autumn", originally by Yoon Do-hyun in 1994. They were released on SoundCloud on May 7, 2015, December 3, 2015, and June 7, 2018, respectively. He has also made several appearances as a co-host for Korean music award shows, such as Music Bank and Inkigayo.

On June 4, 2019, Kim released his first independent song "Tonight" via SoundCloud as part of BTS' sixth anniversary celebrations. The acoustic ballad was composed by Kim and  Big Hit record producers Slow Rabbit and Hiss Noise. Written by Kim and bandmate RM, the song's lyrics are inspired by Kim's relationship with his pets. The track was met with a generally positive reception, with praise for Kim's vocals and the song's calming atmosphere.

Kim released his second solo song "Abyss" via SoundCloud and YouTube on December 3, 2020. An acoustic ballad inspired by his feelings of anxiety, doubt, and burnout, Kim co-wrote and co-composed the track with RM and record producers Bumzu and Pdogg. In a post to the official BTS blog, Kim spoke about his insecurities regarding music and how those darker emotions drove him to write and release the song. 

In October 2021, Kim sang the main theme for the TvN drama series Jirisan. Titled "Yours", the single's release was accompanied by a music video featuring footage from the show. On December 4, Kim released the short trot-style song "Super Tuna" via SoundCloud as a gift to fans in celebration of his 29th birthday. It quickly went viral after an accompanying performance video was posted on the BTS YouTube channel that same day. The video ranked first on YouTube's World Popular Music Video for eight consecutive days and trended in 56 countries, including Korea, Peru, and Singapore. A subsequent dance challenge arose on TikTok, with videos using the sound receiving over 141.8 million cumulative views in 10 days.

In August 2022, Kim collaborated with Nexon as a special game developer for MapleStory. The project was chronicled in the form of a two-episode mini web series, Office Warrior Kim Seok Jin, published to MapleStory Korea's YouTube channel. On October 21, "Tonight", "Abyss", and "Super Tuna" were made available on streaming services worldwide as official singles under Kim's name. All three songs subsequently simultaneously occupied the top three of the November 5 issue of the World Digital Song Sales chart, making Kim the third soloist in the history of the chart to do so. Kim released his debut solo single "The Astronaut", which he co-wrote with the British rock band Coldplay, and an accompanying music video on October 28. He performed the song live with the band later that same day in Buenos Aires during their Music of the Spheres World Tour; the show was broadcast live to cinemas worldwide in over 70 countries. The single earned Kim his first solo entry on the Billboard Hot 100 at number 51 and his third number one on the World chart.

Artistry 
Kim is a tenor and plays the guitar. In the 2019 novel BTS: The Review, members of the Grammy panel praised Kim's stable breath control and strong falsetto, calling it a "silver voice". Journalist Choi Song-hye of Aju News noted that BTS singles such as "Spring Day" and "Fake Love" displayed Kim's vocal stability, while the B-side "Jamais Vu" showcased his emotional range. Hong Hye-min of The Korea Times described Kim's voice as "tender, sorrowful, [and] free-spirited" and considered it to be the "standout element" on the solo ballad "Epiphany". Critic Park Hee-a, discussing "Epiphany", stated that Kim "sings the most sentimental emotions" of the solo tracks on Love Yourself: Answer (2018). In a review of "Fake Love", Park said that Kim's belting "prove[d] [the song's] effectiveness".

Public image

Philanthropy 
In December 2018, Kim donated various supplies to the Korean Animal Welfare Association to celebrate his birthday, purchasing food, blankets, and dishes for the organization. He also donated 321 kilograms of food to the Korea Animal Rights Advocates (KARA), another Korean animal welfare non-profit organization.

Since May 2018, Kim has been a monthly donor to UNICEF Korea, requesting that his donations be kept private at the time. They were eventually publicized following his induction into the UNICEF Honors Club in May 2019 for donating over ₩100 million (about US$84,000).

Influence 
In 2019, Kim was ranked as the overall 13th most popular idol and sixth among girls aged 13–19 in South Korea, via data collected by analytics company Gallup Korea.

Personal life 
As of 2018, Kim lives in Hannam-dong, Seoul, South Korea. Additionally, he and his older brother opened a Japanese-style restaurant in Seoul called Ossu Seiromushi in 2018.

Health 
In March 2022, Kim injured his left hand and underwent surgery to correct it, following which he abstained from certain performances during BTS' Permission to Dance on Stage concerts in Las Vegas, withdrew from some group events, and sang while seated for most of the band's performance at the 64th Annual Grammy Awards.

Military service 
On October 17, 2022, Big Hit announced that following the release of "The Astronaut" and the completion of its subsequent promotional activities at the end of that month, Kim would begin the enlistment process and carry out his mandatory military service. The singer was previously granted an automatic postponement in 2021 until the end of 2022, following revisions made to the Military Service Act in December 2020. On November 4, 2022, Kim filed paperwork with the Military Manpower Administration (MMA) requesting a termination of the postponement in order to proceed with his conscription. He enlisted as an active duty soldier on December 13 at the Yeoncheon army base in the North Gyeonggi Province. Following the completion of his basic training with the 5th Infantry Division in January 2023, Kim was appointed as an assistant training instructor with the same division.

Discography

Singles

Other charted songs

Other songs

Writing credits 
All song credits are adapted from the Korea Music Copyright Association's database, unless otherwise noted.

Filmography

Trailers and short films

Television

Web shows

Awards and nominations

Notes

References

External links

1992 births
Living people
K-pop singers
South Korean male singers
South Korean pop singers
South Korean tenors
South Korean male idols
Japanese-language singers of South Korea
English-language singers from South Korea
BTS members
21st-century South Korean singers
Recipients of the Order of Cultural Merit (Korea)
Gwangsan Kim clan
Konkuk University alumni
Hybe Corporation artists